Bartlett High School is a high school (grades 9-12) located in Bartlett, Tennessee. It is part of the Bartlett City Schools. It was formerly operated by the Shelby County Schools system.  Bartlett has two campuses, the main campus and the Ninth Grade Academy which is located at the former Shadowlawn Middle School campus on Shadowlawn Rd.

Formerly known as Nicholas Blackwell High School, BHS is accredited by the Southern Association of Colleges and Schools and is a member of the NASSP, TSSAA, SACAC, and NACAC. The school was built in 1917. It opened with 100 students and seven faculty members. The first Principal was Miss Dora Gholson.

All Bartlett public schools separated from Shelby County Schools to form a municipal school system in 2014. Bartlett High School is the largest high school in Tennessee, with a combined 9-12 student body of about 2,777 (2020-21).

Bartlett's school colors are red, white, and blue. Their athletic teams compete as the Panthers, or Lady Panthers.
	
The school underwent a massive renovation in 2021. This consisted of building the 2,500 seat McDonald Insurance Arena, a new main lobby and auditorium, connecting all buildings internally (including the old Bartlett Elementary campus), renovating classrooms, admin spaces, STEM, vocational, and athletic spaces. The renovations moved the locations of the cafeteria and library, resulting in brand new ones. Students no longer have to go outside of the buildings to change classes, except for the enclosed courtyard area, thus improving security and student safety.

The current Principals are Tim Jones (Main Campus) and Katie McCain (Ninth Grade Academy).

Athletics 
Sports and State Titles (runner-up)

 Baseball - 2007 (2006, 2008)
 Boys' Basketball - 2001
 Girls' Basketball - (1928, 2023)
 Boys' Bowling* - 2020 (2013, 2022)
 Girls' Bowling* - 2020 (2019)
 Cheerleading - 1986, 1988, 1990 (National Titles)
 Boys' Cross Country* - 2003 (2002, 2018, 2019, 2021)
 Girls' Cross Country* - (1999)
 Boys' Golf* - (1998)
 Girls' Golf* - 1991 (1992)
 Boys' & Girls' Lacrosse
 Boys' & Girls' Soccer
 Softball - (1987)
 Boys' & Girls' Swimming
 Boys' & Girls' Tennis
 Boys' Track & Field* - 1942, 1947, 1948, 1949, 1954, 1958, 1998, 2000, 2001, 2003, 2006, 2007, 2009, 2021, 2022
 Girls' Track & Field* - 1990, 1991, 1992, 2006, 2007, 2021
 Boys' & Girls' Trap
 Boys' Wrestling
 Girls' Wrestling* - 2020, 2021, 2022, 2023
 Volleyball

*Includes team and/or individual championships

Facilities

 Bank of Bartlett Field (Football, Lacrosse, Track & Field)
 Ferguson Road Soccer Field* (Soccer)
 McDonald Insurance Arena (Basketball, Volleyball)
 Thomas J. Farley Gymnasium (Wrestling)
 W. J. Freeman Baseball Complex* (Baseball & Softball)

*Off Campus

Notable alumni/faculty 

 Heather Armstrong, Blogger
 Hope Banks, Actress
 Travis Scott Bowden, Former Pro Wrestling Manager and Historian
 Ronald Davis, Former NFL and CFL player
 Garrett Hines, American Bobsledder & Coach (2002 Olympic Silver Medalist)
 Eric McGill, Professional Basketball Player
 Walter K. Singleton, Medal of Honor Recipient
 Hubie Smith, Retired Boys' Basketball Coach
 Jacob Wilson, Professional Baseball Player
 Daniel Wright, Professional Baseball Pitcher

References

Bartlett, Tennessee
High schools in Tennessee
1917 establishments in Tennessee